

Central banks 
 Hungarian National Bank (MNB)

Commercial banks 
Source:

Calyon Bank no longer available in Hungary 
Credigen Bank  
Magyar Takarékszövetkezeti Bank  
WestLB Hungaria Bank

Market share of banks 
The market share of the banks in terms of assets at the end of 2015, (in brackets, balance sheet total of the year 2015):

 OTP Bank: 7,966.48 billion HUF
 UniCredit Bank: 2,971.12 billion HUF
 K&H Bank: 2,607.22 billion HUF
 Raiffeisen Bank: 1,991.40 billion HUF
 MKB Bank: 1,974.41 billion HUF
 Erste Bank: 1,883.08 billion HUF
 CIB Bank: 1,730.13 billion HUF
 Magyar Fejlesztési Bank (MFB): 1,321.55 billion HUF
 Budapest Bank: 963.67 billion HUF
 FHB Bank: 894.74 billion HUF

Specialized credit institutions 
FHB Jelzálogbank  
Fundamenta-Lakáskassza  
Központi Elszámolóház és Értéktár (Budapest)  
Magyar Export-Import Bank  
Magyar Fejlesztési Bank  
OTP Jelzálogbank  
OTP Lakástakarékpénztár  
UniCredit Jelzálogbank

Representative offices of foreign banks 
These are the registered representative offices of foreign banks within the National Bank of Hungary:
 KDB Bank (1989)
 Commerzbank (1993)
 Deutsche Bank (1995)
 Bank of China (2002)

See also 
 List of Hungarian companies
 Hungarian economy
Complete list as of January 15, 2011. List based on information from the Hungarian Financial Supervisory Authority website.

References 

List of banks in Hungary

Banks
Hungary
Hungary